Margelliantha is a genus of flowering plants from the orchid family, Orchidaceae. It consists of 6 known species, all native to eastern and southern Africa.

Species 

Margelliantha burttii (Summerh.) P.J.Cribb - Zaire, Rwanda
Margelliantha caffra (Bolus) P.J.Cribb & J.Stewart - South Africa
Margelliantha clavata P.J.Cribb - Tanzania
Margelliantha globularis P.J.Cribb - Tanzania
Margelliantha lebelii Eb.Fisch. & Killmann - Rwanda
Margelliantha leedalii P.J.Cribb - Tanzania, Kenya

See also 
 List of Orchidaceae genera

References 

  (1979) Kew Bulletin 34: 329.
  2005. Handbuch der Orchideen-Namen. Dictionary of Orchid Names. Dizionario dei nomi delle orchidee. Ulmer, Stuttgart
  (Eds) (2014) Genera Orchidacearum Volume 6: Epidendroideae (Part 3); page 405 ff., Oxford: Oxford University Press.

External links 
 

Vandeae genera
Angraecinae
Orchids of Africa